Bhajani is a Municipality in Kailali District in Sudurpashchim Province of Nepal. At the time of the  2011 Nepal censusit had a population of 52,128. It is surrounded by Tikapur Municipality and Joshipur Rural Municipality in the East , Kailari Rural Municipality in the West , Ghodaghodi Municipality in the North and Tikunia, Uttar Pradesh in the South . It is divided into 9 wards .

Election Result 
2017 Nepalese local elections

Mayoral Election

Deputy Mayor Election

See also
 Kailali District
 Tikapur
 Sudurpashchim Province

References

External links
UN map of the municipalities of Kailali District

Populated places in Kailali District
Municipalities in Kailali District
Nepal municipalities established in 2014